Justice Miller may refer to:

Samuel Freeman Miller (1816–1890), justice of the Supreme Court of the United States
Andrew G. Miller (1801–1874), associate justice of the Territorial Wisconsin Supreme Court
Asher Miller (1752–1821), associate justice of the Connecticut Supreme Court
Benjamin K. Miller (judge) (born 1936), associate justice of the Supreme Court of Illinois
Benjamin M. Miller (1864–1944), associate justice of the Supreme Court of Alabama
Bert H. Miller (1876–1949), associate justice of the Idaho Supreme Court
Ernest M. Miller (1890–1941), associate justice of the Iowa Supreme Court
Frederic M. Miller (1896–1958), associate justice of the Iowa Supreme Court
Henry C. Miller (1828–1899), associate justice of the Louisiana Supreme Court
John Miller (Indiana judge) (1840–1898), associate justice of the Supreme Court of Indiana
Justin Miller (judge) (1888–1973), associate justice of the United States Court of Appeals for the District of Columbia
Nathan L. Miller (1868–1953), justice of the New York Supreme Court from 1903 to 1915
Oliver Miller (judge) (1824–1892), associate justice of the Maryland Court of Appeals
Robert A. Miller (judge) (born 1939), former chief justice of the South Dakota Supreme Court
Robert H. Miller (judge) (1919–2009), chief justice of the Kansas Supreme Court
Theodore Miller (1816–1895), judge of the New York Court of Appeals
Thomas B. Miller (West Virginia judge) (died 2008), associate justice of the Supreme Court of Appeals of West Virginia
Warren Miller (West Virginia congressman) (1847–1920), associate justice of the Supreme Court of Appeals of West Virginia
William E. Miller (Iowa judge) (1823–1897), associate justice of the Iowa Supreme Court
William N. Miller (1855–1928), associate justice of the Supreme Court of Appeals of West Virginia
Willis D. Miller (1893–1960), justice of the Supreme Court of Appeals of Virginia

See also
Lindsey Miller-Lerman (born 1947), associate justice of the Nebraska Supreme Court
Judge Miller (disambiguation)